Porto Pollo (also Porto Puddu in Sardinian, Chicken Harbour in English) is an Italian località, in the comune of Palau, on the northern Sardinian shore in the province of Sassari. It is named after the natural harbour just east of the baia di levante (eastern bay), east of Isuledda. The bay is known for watersports.

References

Neighbourhoods in Italy
Frazioni of the Province of Sassari